The Collaborative College for Technology and Leadership (CCTL) is an early college High School program in Iredell County, North Carolina. Founded in 2005, CCTL has been recognized as a school for "Innovation and Excellence," a distinction given to only 16 schools in North Carolina. It received the Apple Distinguished School Award in 2016.

Students graduate from CCTL with an associate degree within five years and have the option of completing the program in 4 years. All credits are transferable to universities in the University of North Carolina system, withstanding that a student has received a grade of "C" or higher in each class to be transferred.

Because CCTL is on the Statesville main campus of Mitchell Community College, the affiliation between the two schools is the strongest among all the early college programs in Iredell County, and CCTL students must adhere to both the early college and Mitchell Community College policies.

References

Public universities and colleges in North Carolina
Schools in Iredell County, North Carolina
Educational institutions established in 2005
2005 establishments in North Carolina